The kiss of Judas, also known as the Betrayal of Christ, is the act with which Judas identified Jesus to the multitude with swords and clubs who had come from the chief priests and elders of the people to arrest him, according to the Synoptic Gospels. The kiss is given by Judas in the Garden of Gethsemane after the Last Supper and leads directly to the arrest of Jesus by the police force of the Sanhedrin.

Within the life of Jesus in the New Testament, the events of his identification to hostile forces and subsequent execution are directly foreshadowed both when Jesus predicts his betrayal and Jesus predicts his death.

More broadly, a Judas kiss may refer to "an act appearing to be an act of friendship, which is in fact harmful to the recipient."

In Christianity, the betrayal of Jesus is mourned on Spy Wednesday (Holy Wednesday) of Holy Week.

In the New Testament 
Judas was not the only disciple of Jesus but one of twelve Apostles. Most Apostles originated from Galilee but Judas came from Judea. The gospels of Matthew (26:47–50) and Mark (14:43–45) both use the Greek verb καταφιλέω (kataphileó), which means to "kiss, caress; distinct from φιλεῖν (philein); especially of an amorous kiss." It is the same verb that Plutarch uses to describe a famous kiss that Alexander the Great gave to Bagoas. The compound verb (κατα-) "has the force of an emphatic, ostentatious salute." Lutheran theologian Johann Bengel suggests that Judas kissed Him repeatedly: "he kissed Him more than once in opposition to what he had said in the preceding verse: , philēsō, a single kiss, and did so as if from kindly feeling."

According to Matthew 26:50, Jesus responded by saying: "Friend, do what you are here to do." Luke 22:48 quotes Jesus saying "Judas, are you betraying the Son of Man with a kiss?"

Jesus's arrest follows immediately.

In liturgics 
In the Divine Liturgy of Saint John Chrysostom the Greek Orthodox Church uses the troparion Of thy Mystical Supper.., in which the hymnist vows to Jesus that he will "...not kiss Thee as did Judas..." («...οὐ φίλημά σοι δώσω,καθάπερ ὁ Ἰούδας...»):

Commentary
Justus Knecht comments on Judas' kiss writing,
He did not refuse his treacherous kiss: He suffered His sacred Face to be touched by the lips of this vile traitor, and He even called him: “Friend!” “I have always treated you as My friend”, He meant to imply, “why therefore do you come now at the head of My enemies, and betray Me to them by a kiss!” This loving treatment on the part of our Lord was to the ungrateful traitor a last hour of grace. Jesus gave him to understand that He still loved him in spite of his vile crime, and was ready to forgive him.

Cornelius a Lapide in his great commentary writes,
Victor of Antioch says, “The unhappy man gave the kiss of peace to Him against whom he was laying deadly snares.” “Giving,” says pseudo-Jerome, “the sign of the kiss with the poison of deceit.” Moreover, though Christ felt deeply, and was much pained at His betrayal by Judas, yet He refused not his kiss, and gave him a loving kiss in return. 1. “That He might not seem to shrink from treachery” (St. Ambrose in Luke xxi. 45), but willingly to embrace it and even greater indignities, for our sake. 2. To soften and pierce the heart of Judas; and 3. To teach us to love our enemies and those whom we know would rage against us (St. Hilary of Poitiers). For Christ hated not, but loved the traitor, and grieved more at his sin than at His own betrayal, and accordingly strove to lead him to repentance.

In art 
The scene is nearly always included, either as the Kiss itself, or the moment after, the Arrest of Jesus, or the two combined (as above), in the cycles of the Life of Christ in art or Passion of Jesus in various media.  In some Byzantine cycles it is the only scene before the Crucifixion.  A few examples include:
 Probably the best known is from Giotto's cycle in the Scrovegni Chapel in Padua.
 The Taking of Christ by Caravaggio.
 A  sixth-century Byzantine Mosaic in Ravenna.
 A fresco by Barna da Siena.
 A sculpture representing the Kiss of Judas appears on the Passion façade of the Sagrada Família basilica in Barcelona.

See also 
 Bargain of Judas
 Chronology of Jesus
 Gospel of Judas
 Kiss of death (mafia)

References

Further reading 
 
 

Passion of Jesus
Judas Iscariot
Judas
Gethsemane